Twitter Zero is an initiative undertaken by social networking service company Twitter in collaboration with mobile phone-based Internet providers, whereby the providers waive data (bandwidth) charges—so-called "zero-rate"—for accessing Twitter on phones when using a stripped-down text-only version of the website. The images could be loaded by using the official Twitter app. The stripped-down version is available only through providers who have entered the agreement with Twitter.

Partners 
  with Ncell.
  with Reliance Communications.
  with Ucell.
  with Turkcell.
  with Vodafone and Smart Communications.
 with XL Axiata.

See also
 Alliance for Affordable Internet
 Google Free Zone
 Internet.org
 Wikipedia Zero
 Facebook Zero
 Facebook for SIM
 Airtel Zero

References

Twitter